In mathematics, the overlapping interval topology is a topology which is used to illustrate various topological principles.

Definition

Properties

See also 

 List of topologies
 Particular point topology, a topology where sets are considered open if they are empty or contain a particular, arbitrarily chosen, point of the topological space

References
  (See example 53)  

Topological spaces